The Roman Catholic Diocese of Lichinga is a diocese located in the city of Lichinga in the Ecclesiastical province of Nampula in Mozambique.

History
 July 21, 1963: Established as Diocese of Vila Cabral from the Diocese of Nampula
 July 29, 1976: Renamed as Diocese of Lichinga

Leadership
 Bishops of Vila Cabral (Roman rite)
 Bishop Eurico Dias Nogueira (1964.07.10 – 1972.02.19), appointed Bishop of Sá da Bandeira, Angola; future Archbishop
 Bishop Luís Gonzaga Ferreira da Silva, S.J. (1972.11.10 – 1976.07.29 see below)
 Bishops of Lichinga (Roman rite)
 Bishop Luís Gonzaga Ferreira da Silva, S.J. (see above 1976.07.29 – 2003.01.25)
 Bishop Hilário Da Cruz Massinga, O.F.M. (2003.04.05 - 2008.01.25), appointed Bishop of Quelimane
 Bishop Elio Giovanni Greselin, S.C.I. (2008.12.30 - 2015.02.08)
 Bishop Atanasio Amisse Canira (since 2015.02.08)

See also
Roman Catholicism in Mozambique

Sources
 GCatholic.org
 Catholic Hierarchy

Lichinga
Christian organizations established in 1963
Roman Catholic dioceses and prelatures established in the 20th century
1963 establishments in Mozambique
Roman Catholic Ecclesiastical Province of Nampula